The Widows' Adventure is a 1989 fiction novel written by Charles Dickinson, centered on two widowed sisters who embark on an unlikely trip from Chicago to Los Angeles, setting off a comic family odyssey of revelation and reconciliation.

Plot summary 
Widows Ina and Helene, sisters from Chicago, set off on a drive to Los Angeles. There’s one problem: Only Helene can drive, and she’s blind. Beer-swigging Ina acts as her eyes. On back roads in the dead of night they travel across an America they never knew.

Reception 
The Widows' Adventures received positive reviews from critics.  Barbara Kingsolver of the Los Angeles Times stated “That most wonderful and increasingly rare sort of novel written by an author who loves his characters beyond measure.”  Hilma Wolitzer of The New York Times wrote that the novel had "quirky freshness", and calling Dickinson "a writer of uncommon interest." Library Journal praised Dickinson's writing by saying "The characterization develops fully just soon enough to hook the reader, who may find this novel a refreshing change, as it examines the physical, emotional, and spiritual lives of two endearing but not perfect older women.”

Film adaptation 
In 2008, Variety reported that Diane Keaton and Jane Fonda had signed on to star in the film adaptation of the novel, based on a spec script written by Jason Pomerance.  The film was to be produced by Paul Brooks of Gold Circle Films.

References

External links 
 Official Website
 The Widow's Adventures at HarperCollins Publishers

1989 American novels
American adventure novels
William Morrow and Company books
Novels set in Chicago
English-language novels
Novels set in the 1980s
Books about women